Verano may refer to:

 Verano (Neighborhood), a neighborhood in Talega, California
 Verano, Italy, or Vöran, a comune in South Tyrol, Italy
 Verano Brianza, a municipality in the province of Milan, Italy
 Verano (surname), a surname (including a list of people with the name)
 Verano (film), or Summer, a 2011 Chilean film
 Operation Verano, a 1958 offensive against revolutionaries in Cuba
"Verano", a song by Natalia LaFourcade from Las 4 Estaciones del Amor
"Verano", a song by La Oreja de Van Gogh  from El planeta imaginario
 Buick Verano, a four-door, five passenger sedan sold by Buick in North America
 Campo Verano, a cemetery in Rome, Italy that was founded in the early nineteenth century